Marvin Ridge High School (commonly Marvin, Marvin Ridge, or MRHS) is a public high school in Marvin, North Carolina, USA serving students in grades 9–12. The school is part of the Union County Public School system. The school occupies a two-story building with a full auditorium and fully air-conditioned gym. Admission is based primarily on the location of students' homes and district lines. Marvin Ridge High was ranked 1st among the 300–399 cohort size for having a 99.3 percent graduation rate in North Carolina. It is ranked the 275th best high school in the country in 2017 by U.S. News & World Report.

History
The school was founded in 2007 to reduce overcrowding in the neighboring Weddington High School, transferring about half of the student body to the new school.

The school serves neighborhoods in the Marvin, NC and Waxhaw, NC areas. Three elementary schools,  Rea View Elementary, Marvin Elementary, and Sandy Ridge Elementary, feed into the school, as does Marvin Ridge Middle School (located directly behind Marvin Ridge High School).

The school's teams are known as the Marvin Ridge Mavericks with school colors orange and royal blue.

Demographics
The school is ranked a ten out of ten on the "Great Schools" website However, the diversity rates tend to be less than the state average for every ethnicity with the exception of white/caucasian. There are 80% White students, 10% Asian, 4% Hispanic, 4% Black, and less than 1% American Indian or Alaskan Native.

Academics
Marvin Ridge was named a North Carolina Honor School of Excellence with High Growth in 2009–2010. The school has a college preparatory orientation, offering a variety of Honors and Advanced Placement classes as well as the only International Baccalaureate Diploma program in the Union County schools. The school offers nineteen Advanced Placement courses, five foreign languages (Spanish, French, German, Chinese, and Latin). The Distance Learning Program is also offered through the internet through Odyssey-ware.
EOC results for the senior class of 2010 for Marvin Ridge was above district and state averages in every subject. The school actually had a 100% passing rate in Biology, Civics and Economics, U.S. History, and English 101. The school was named the Honor School of Excellence for 2008–2009 and 2009–2010 by the State Department of Education for having a 91.3% or higher average on EOC tests. Thus far the school has also met all Adequate Yearly Progress goals under the No Child Left Behind guidelines. It has the highest English II Writing Scores in 2008–2009 in Union County

Athletics

Cross Country and track
The Marvin Ridge Cross Country and Track team has won seven State Championships since the school opened in 2007. They consist of five indoor track and two outdoor track state championships. The men's and women's indoor track team were back-to-back state champions in the 2013–2014 season and the 2014–2015 season.

Cheerleading
In the 2009–2010 school year the Maverick Cheerleaders won the State Championship, and again in the 2011–2012 school year.

Men's soccer
The MRHS Men's soccer team won three State titles in eight years.. Its most recent championship was in 2016 against Chapel Hill High School.

Women's Soccer
The school's Women's Soccer team has won the conference championship four years in a row.  In 2010 the team finished their season with a perfect score of 24-0 winning the NCHSSA women's soccer title. The team only allowed 4 goals all season.

Wachovia Cup
In 2008, the school won the conference Wachovia Cup. In 2009 it won the cup for 3-A schools, but placed fourth in the final standings; it had the same result in 2010. In 2011 it again won the cup for 3-A schools, but placed third in the final standings.\

Swim team
Both the girls and boys teams won the NCHSAA 3A state championships in 2017.

Clubs
There are over forty active clubs at Marvin Ridge.

Student council
The Marvin Ridge High School Student Council is a North Carolina Association of Student Councils (NCASC), Southern Association of Student Councils (SASC), and National Association of Student Councils (NASC) member school and has been recognized every year as a NCASC Clinton Blake Honor Council since 2009. Marvin Ridge served as the North Carolina Western District Chair School during the 2014–2015 school year and the North Carolina Communications Officer School during the 2015-2016 school year. The Student Council boosts "Maverick Pride" and school morale around the halls of Marvin Ridge High School. They host events such as talent shows, Sadie Hawkins, prom, and many more.

FBLA
The MRHS FBLA chapter is the largest chapter in North Carolina with over two hundred members annually.

Speech and debate
In 2011 the Marvin Ridge Speech and Debate team placed as the second best Speech and Debate team in the state. In 2010 there were six qualifiers for the National Forensics League

Marching band
The MRHS Marching Mavericks have enjoyed great success and have traveled across the country competing in numerous competitions. The band also traveled to Ireland in the Spring of 2012 to perform in the Dublin Saint Patrick's Day Parade.

Theatre
The school's Theatre Arts program offers experience in acting, directing, playwrighting, technical theatre, and dramaturgy. The school   has put on four or five productions each year

The school also has an improvisational group, "Check". This improvisation troupe entered the Olympics in Rock Hill on March 19, 2011, and won first place.

Choir
The school's Choir performed at the Carnegie Hall in the spring of 2011.

HOSA
The largest club at Marvin Ridge High School is HOSA a health occupational club targeted at creating "future health professionals" who are interested in pursuing the medical field.

Notable alumni
 K. J. Brent (c/o 2011), former NFL wide receiver
 Kyle Parker (c/o 2012), professional soccer player
 Vinnie Sunseri, former NFL safety and current NFL coach; attended through Junior year

References

2007 establishments in North Carolina
Educational institutions established in 2007
Public high schools in North Carolina
Schools in Union County, North Carolina